Science Fiction (full title: Science Fiction, Fantasy i Horror) was a Polish speculative fiction monthly magazine. It was established in 2001 under the name Science Fiction by Robert J. Szmidt, who was also the first editor. It is geared mostly towards Polish fantasy and science fiction, but occasionally publishes translations, primarily from non-English languages. The headquarters was in Katowice.

In 2005 the magazine was renamed to Science Fiction, Fantasy i Horror. Since 2009 it is published by Fabryka Słów. Later editor was Rafał Dębski.

Notable authors who were associated with the magazine include Feliks W. Kres, Andrzej Pilipiuk, Jarosław Grzędowicz, Romuald Pawlak, Adam Cebula, Marek Żelkowski, Wiktor Żwikiewicz, Jacek Dukaj.

From 2004 the magazine sponsored the Nautilus Award.

The magazine ceased publication in 2012.

References

External links
 Homepage

2001 establishments in Poland
2012 disestablishments in Poland
Defunct literary magazines published in Poland
Magazines established in 2001
Magazines disestablished in 2012
Mass media in Katowice
Monthly magazines published in Poland
Polish-language magazines
Polish science fiction
Science fiction magazines